Amirhossein Kargar (born November 22, 1998) is an Iranian footballer who currently plays as a right-back for Iranian club Malavan in the Azadegan League.

Club career

Esteghlal
He made his debut for Esteghlal in last fixtures of 2019–20 Iran Pro League against Shahin Bushehr while he substituted in for Mehdi Ghayedi.

References

Living people
1998 births
Association football defenders
People from Tehran
Iranian footballers
Esteghlal F.C. players
Malavan players
Persian Gulf Pro League players